Melvin Goes to Dinner is a 2003 American film adaptation of Michael Blieden's stage play Phyro-Giants!, directed by Bob Odenkirk. Blieden wrote the screenplay from his stage play, and he also stars in the film (as he did in the Los Angeles stage production), along with Stephanie Courtney, Matt Price and Annabelle Gurwitch. The film premiered at the 2003 Slamdance Film Festival.

Plot
Former medical student Melvin has dropped out and now works (after a fashion) in a planning office of an unnamed city. The office supervisor is his big sister, who "mothers" him instead of making him perform well. Melvin accidentally makes telephone contact with an old friend, and they decide to meet for dinner that evening. The friend arrives early for drinks with a lady friend; by the appointed time, four people are involved, each connected somehow to at least one of the others. The evening passes in a leisurely dinner with much conversation, sometimes intimate; the connections among the parties are revealed throughout the evening. The movie includes several flashbacks, which are not immediately explained but become understandable by the end.

Cast

Several notable people appeared as extras in the film, including Kristen Wiig, Bill Odenkirk, Daisy Gardner, Allan Havey, Nathan Odenkirk (son of Bob and Naomi Odenkirk), Scott Adsit, Wendy Rae Fowler, Tucker Smallwood, B. J. Porter, James Gunn, and Marc Evan Jackson.

Production
Michael Penn wrote the music for the film. The film won the Audience Award at the 2003 South by Southwest Film Festival and the Best Picture and Best Ensemble Awards at the Phoenix Film Festival.

The movie uses many actors who are mainliners in other television productions, such as Odenkirk's former Mr. Show co-star David Cross as a self-help seminar leader. However, the main characters are all played by the stage actors who performed in the Los Angeles stage production on which the screenplay is based.

Odenkirk also directed a short film that was included on the Melvin Goes to Dinner DVD release, The Frank International Film Festival. It portrayed the screening of Melvin Goes to Dinner at a (fictional) film festival organized by a cinephile named Frank (Fred Armisen) who hosts the festival at the home he shares with his mother.

Reception 
On Rotten Tomatoes, Melvin Goes to Dinner has an approval rating of 100% based on 12 reviews.

Marjorie Baumgarten of The Austin Chronicle wrote Odenkirk "shows real skill with the gradual manner in which he allows this story to evolve", and that the "movie should inspire viewers to call up old friends, order a bottle of wine, and talk the night away."

References

External links
Official site

Interview with Michael Blieden and Bob Odenkirk from Gannett Journal News (2003)

2003 films
2003 comedy films
American films based on plays
American independent films
2003 independent films
Films directed by Bob Odenkirk
Films scored by Michael Penn
Films set in restaurants
Films about conversations
2003 directorial debut films
2000s English-language films
2000s American films